James Kenneth Perry (born August 10, 1960) is an American professional golfer who currently plays on the PGA Tour Champions. He won 14 PGA Tour events and has won nine PGA Tour Champions events including four senior major championships: the 2013 Constellation Senior Players Championship, the 2013 U.S. Senior Open, the 2014 Regions Tradition, and the 2017 U.S. Senior Open.

Early years
Perry was born in Elizabethtown, Kentucky, and raised in Franklin, Kentucky. His parents are Ken and Mildred Perry. He was introduced to the game of golf by his father at the age of seven. 

He started his high school golf career at Franklin-Simpson High School. Shortly thereafter, his father accepted a job opportunity in McCracken County a few miles outside Paducah, Kentucky. Kenny attended high school and played on the golf team at McCracken County's Lone Oak High School, near Paducah.  After graduating from Lone Oak, he attended Western Kentucky University in Bowling Green.

Personal life
Perry has three children (Lesslye (Harris), Justin and Lindsey) with his wife, Sandy Perry. His son Justin played on Western Kentucky University's golf team, and has also caddied for his father on several occasions. His mother, Mildred, died on October 1, 2009, at the age of 79 at her home in Franklin while under Hospice care after a long battle with multiple myeloma a cancer of the plasma cells in bone marrow. Perry is a member and deacon of Franklin Church of Christ in Franklin, Kentucky.

Professional career
Perry turned professional in 1982. He failed in his first two attempts to qualify for the PGA Tour at Q-school. He missed by 1 stroke one year and received word that his wife had gone into labor during the fourth round the next year.  He had been sponsored by a group of about twenty individuals, many local citizens from Franklin, in his early play on the mini-tours and his first two attempts at Q-school. In 1985, a Franklin businessman and David Lipscomb University (now simply Lipscomb University) graduate lent him $5000 for a last shot at Q-school.  Rather than repay the loan, he was asked to give a percentage of his tour earnings to Lipscomb if he qualified. He tied for 40th at Q-school, earning his card with a two-shot cushion. Perry and his benefactor agreed on 5 percent, and he has maintained that commitment to Lipscomb ever since in the form of a scholarship for residents of Simpson County, Kentucky.

In Perry's first few seasons, he struggled to retain his qualification status.  He made his first big (for the time) check on the PGA Tour ($55,000) with a T-4 finish at the Panasonic Las Vegas Invitational in May 1987.  Shortly after that tournament, Perry repaid all of the money put up by all of his original sponsors, even though he had no legal obligation to do so.  Perry got his first win in 1991 at the Memorial Tournament. Two more wins followed in the mid 1990s, another in 2001, and three victories in 2003.

In 1996, Perry was in contention at the PGA Championship held at Valhalla in his native Kentucky. He had a one shot lead on the last hole but took a bogey and proceeded to be beaten in the playoff by Mark Brooks.

Perry played in the 2004 Ryder Cup at Oakland Hills Country Club in Bloomfield Township, Michigan. On the first day, Perry played in an afternoon foursome with Stewart Cink and they lost to Sergio García and Luke Donald (2 & 1). On the third day, Perry played in a singles match and lost to Lee Westwood (1 up). Team Europe defeated Team USA 18½ to 9½.

In 2005, Perry won at the Bay Hill Invitational and the Bank of America Colonial. The following year, he became the 10th man to reach $20 million in PGA Tour career earnings in addition to taking an 8-week break from the tour to recover from knee surgery. He was in the top-10 of the Official World Golf Ranking for over 100 weeks from 2003 to 2005 and 2009 to 2010.

Since returning from arthroscopic knee surgery in early 2006, Perry struggled to find the previous form he had from 2003 to 2005. However, in 2008, he had a steady start making 10 cuts in his first 11 tournaments, and beginning in the middle of May he had six top ten finishes in eight starts, including three victories in the Memorial Tournament, the Buick Open, and the John Deere Classic (in which he beat Jay Williamson and Brad Adamonis in a playoff). He received some criticism for skipping major championships in 2008 in order to concentrate on qualifying for the Ryder Cup team. He was eager to make the team as the event was being held in his native Kentucky, and he helped the USA win the cup for the first time since 1999.

Perry played in the 2008 Ryder Cup at the Valhalla Golf Club in Louisville, Kentucky. On the first day, Perry played a morning foursome with Jim Furyk and they halved the match with Sergio García and Lee Westwood. On the second day, Perry played a morning foursome with Furyk and they defeated Pádraig Harrington and Robert Karlsson (3 & 1). Also on day two, Perry played an afternoon fourball with Furyk and they lost to Ian Poulter and Graeme McDowell (1 up). On the third day, Perry played in a singles match and defeated Henrik Stenson (3 & 2). Team USA defeated Team Europe 16½ to 11½.

Despite rumors that he would retire following Team USA's Ryder Cup victory, Perry confirmed at the start of the 2009 PGA Tour season that he hoped to win at least eight more tournaments, which would take his career total to 20. Twenty wins ensures a lifetime PGA Tour membership.

Perry won his first event in 2009 in his third start at the FBR Open, where he defeated Charley Hoffman on the third playoff hole with a birdie.
It was his 13th career tour win. He maintained a rich vein of form throughout the first few months of the 2009 season, making ten cuts in ten events and registering five top-10 finishes during this streak. 

In April 2009, Perry was the 54-hole co-leader at The Masters and held the lead by two strokes with two holes to go. However, he recorded two straight bogeys, after failing to find the green in regulation at both the 17th and 18th holes. This resulted in a sudden-death playoff with Ángel Cabrera and Chad Campbell. Perry made par on the first extra hole, to match Cabrera, but Campbell was eliminated after he made bogey. At the second extra hole, Perry missed the green from the middle of the fairway and then ran his pitch well past the hole, resulting in a bogey. Cabrera then won the playoff and the tournament with a par. Perry would have become the oldest winner of The Masters at 48 years old, 8 months, and 2 days. He received over 700 letters and emails in the aftermath of his playoff defeat, including a note from former President George W. Bush.

Perry won his second event of 2009 at the Travelers Championship in June, coming from one stroke behind Paul Goydos. Perry shot a final round 63 and won his 14th tour event, one win closer to his goal of 20 career wins. He won the event by three strokes over Goydos and fellow American David Toms. With the win he moved into a career high spot of four at the Official World Golf Ranking.

Perry is among the winningest and highest all-time PGA Tour money winners without a major championship, with fourteen wins and career earnings of over $32 million. His best major finishes are playoff losses at the 1996 PGA Championship and 2009 Masters Tournament. For his success in leading the US to victory in the Ryder Cup, he and fellow Kentuckian J. B. Holmes were named Kentuckians of the Year for 2008 by Kentucky Monthly magazine. He is good friends with former World Number 1 player Vijay Singh, who calls him "Biggie".

Perry began playing on the Champions Tour after turning 50 in August 2010 while continuing to play on the PGA Tour. He won his first event in October 2011 at the SAS Championship. He nearly withdrew from the event after learning of his sister's death. In 2011, Perry split his time between the PGA Tour and the Champions Tour. He finished 15th on the Champions Tour money list playing in ten events. Although his focus was on the Champions Tour, he also had status on the PGA Tour until 2014 due to multiple wins in 2008 and 2009.

Perry won for the second time on the Champions Tour early in 2012 at the ACE Group Classic. He shot rounds of 64 and 62 on the first two days to break the 36 hole scoring record on the Champions Tour and after ending with a 2 under par round of 70, he tied the overall tournament scoring record at 20 under par.

Perry was given a special invitation from the PGA of America to compete in the 2014 PGA Championship, held in his home state of Kentucky and site of his 1996 playoff loss; he finished T27.

In 2015, he used a one-time exemption for being the top 25 of the career money list. He said he intended to play 18 events on the PGA Tour and only about seven on the Champions Tour, mainly the major tournaments.

Honors
In 1993, Perry was inducted into the Kentucky Golf Hall of Fame. In 1994, he was inducted in the Western Kentucky University Hall of Fame. He was named the winner of the 2002 Charles Bartlett Award, given to a professional golfer for his unselfish contributions to the betterment of society, by the Golf Writers Association of America. In 2007, Perry was inducted into the Western Kentucky University Hall of Distinguished Alumni. On October 14, 2008, Perry was inducted into Lipscomb University's Athletics Hall of Fame.  He won the 2009 Payne Stewart Award.

On November 3, 2013, Perry clinched the 2013 Charles Schwab Cup. He was also named 2013 Champions Tour Player of the Year.

Professional wins (27)

PGA Tour wins (14)

PGA Tour playoff record (3–3)

Other wins (3)

PGA Tour Champions wins (10)

PGA Tour Champions playoff record (1–4)

Results in major championships

CUT = missed the half-way cut
"T" = tied
WD  = Withdrew

Summary

Most consecutive cuts made – 6 (twice)
Longest streak of top-10s – 3 (2003 U.S. Open – 2003 PGA)

Results in The Players Championship

CUT = missed the halfway cut
WD = withdrew
"T" indicates a tie for a place

Results in World Golf Championships

1Cancelled due to 9/11

QF, R16, R32, R64 = Round in which player lost in match play
"T" = Tied
NT = No tournament
Note that the HSBC Champions did not become a WGC event until 2009.

Senior major championships

Wins (4)

Results timeline
Results not in chronological order before 2021.

CUT = missed the halfway cut
WD = withdrew
"T" indicates a tie for a place
NT = No tournament due to COVID-19 pandemic

U.S. national team appearances
Professional
Presidents Cup: 1996 (winners), 2003 (tie), 2005 (winners), 2009 (winners)
Ryder Cup: 2004, 2008 (winners)
Wendy's 3-Tour Challenge (representing Champions Tour): 2008 (PGA Tour), 2010, 2011 (winners), 2013

See also
1986 PGA Tour Qualifying School graduates
List of golfers with most PGA Tour Champions wins

References

External links

Lipscomb University press release - on the occasion of the honoring of Perry's benefactor
Golf Today profile from 2003

American male golfers
Western Kentucky Hilltoppers golfers
PGA Tour golfers
PGA Tour Champions golfers
Winners of senior major golf championships
Ryder Cup competitors for the United States
Golfers from Kentucky
Lone Oak High School (Kentucky) alumni
American members of the Churches of Christ
People from Elizabethtown, Kentucky
Sportspeople from Paducah, Kentucky
People from Franklin, Kentucky
1960 births
Living people